Mock's Bottom (also Mocks Bottom) is a lowland northeast of Swan Island in Portland, Oregon, United States. It acquired its name from Henry Mock, who settled a donation land claim in the area with his family in 1852. Mock's Crest, named for Henry Mock's son John Mock, is a bluff that overlooks the lowland.

Mock's Bottom existed as a wetland under natural conditions. In 1920, a committee appointed by Portland mayor George L. Baker recommended that Mock's Bottom be filled for future industrial development. At the time, a large portion of Mock's Bottom was owned by private interests, and was considered to be one of the best duck hunting areas in Portland.

The Port of Portland purchased Mock's Bottom from Multnomah County in 1958. In 1980, the Port reached an agreement with the City of Portland whereby  of Mock's Bottom would be developed into industrial land. Port officials designated the project the "Mocks Landing Industrial Park", as they felt "bottom" was not dignified. The first land sale at the industrial park was completed in May 1981, and dredging was nearly completed by January 1982.

See also
 John Mock House, located on Mock's Crest

References

External links

 1939 photograph of Swan Island and Mock's Bottom at Vintage Portland
 1949 photograph of Mock's Bottom at Vintage Portland

Geography of Portland, Oregon
History of Portland, Oregon
Landforms of Multnomah County, Oregon
Overlook, Portland, Oregon
Port of Portland (Oregon)
Wetlands of Oregon